Rene van der Merwe (born 15 June 1986) is a South African female high jumper. She was the gold medallist at the 2006 African Championships in Athletics, extending her country's success in the event from Hestrie Cloete. She went on to compete for Africa at the 2006 IAAF World Cup. The following year, she was fourth at the 2007 All-Africa Games.

International competitions

References

External links

Living people
1986 births
South African female high jumpers
Place of birth missing (living people)
Competitors at the 2009 Summer Universiade
Athletes (track and field) at the 2007 All-Africa Games
African Games competitors for South Africa